Changing room may refer to:
Changing room, also locker room or dressing room, an enclosed area in a store where customers may try on clothes before purchasing them
Changing Rooms, a BBC television series
Changing Rooms (Australian TV series), based on the BBC television series
The Changing Room, a play by David Storey